Wendy Luebbers Schuller is an American basketball coach who was, until 2021, the head coach for the Eastern Washington Eagles women's basketball team, a position she had held since 2001.

Born in Redlands, California, Schuller attended and played for Fresno Pacific University as a shooting guard for the Sunbirds. Before graduating in 1992, she was selected as an NAIA Academic All-American.

As coach at Eastern Washington, Schuller has advanced to the Big Sky Conference tournament 16 times. She led the 2009–10 team to the program's first-ever Big Sky regular-season championship, and then to the program's first Women's National Invitation Tournament appearance that same season and in the 2012–13 and 2014–15 seasons.

Schuller's husband Mark is the city administrator in Cheney, Washington, where they reside. They are parents of three children.

Head coaching record

References

External links 
 Schuller's bio at EWU

1970 births
Living people
American women's basketball coaches
People from Redlands, California
Eastern Washington Eagles women's basketball coaches
Northwestern State Lady Demons basketball coaches
Fresno Pacific University alumni